Lemurophoenix halleuxii is a species of palm tree, the only species in the genus Lemurophoenix. It is found only in Madagascar. It is threatened by habitat loss and overcollection. There are perhaps 300 mature individuals remaining in the wild.

Range and habitat
Lemurophoenix halleuxii is endemic to the Antongil Bay area northeastern Madagascar, including the Masoala Peninsula and Mananara Avaratra. There are three known subpopulations. The largest is in the Ratanabe area, and there is another in Masoala National Park on the Masoala Peninsula. The species' estimated extent of occurrence is 1,729 km2 and its estimated area of occupancy is 31 km2.

It grows in primary humid evergreen lowland forest on steep slopes and in deep narrow valleys, generally between 200 and 450 meters elevation, and occasionally as high as 700 meters.

Conservation and threats
The species is threatened with habitat loss outside of designated protected areas. The species' conservation status is assessed as endangered, given its restricted range, its small population size, loss of habitat, and declining population size.

References

Dypsidinae
Endemic flora of Madagascar
Flora of the Madagascar lowland forests
Endangered plants
Monotypic Arecaceae genera
Taxonomy articles created by Polbot